Ivan Nikolaevich Zubachyov (1898–1944) was a Soviet officer known for the defense of the Citadel of Brest Fortress.

Biography 
Born on February 28, 1898, in the village of Podlesnaya Sloboda, Zaraysky District, Ryazan Governorate, in a peasant family. He worked as a blacksmith at the Kolomna plant.

In 1918 he joined the Russian Communist Party (Bolsheviks), and served in the Red Army during the Russian Civil War and the Polish-Soviet War.

Zubachyov later served during the Winter War with the rank of captain and the post of commander of the battalion of the 44th regiment. The regiment from May 1941 was stationed at Brest Fortress. With the German attack on June 22, due to the fact that the regiment commander Pyotr Gavrilov was cut off with his detachment in the Kobryn fortification, Zubachyov led the defense on the site of the regiment. On June 24 at a meeting of senior officers, he was appointed commander of the consolidated defense group. His deputy was appointed regimental commissar Yefim Fomin. On this council, Zubachyov categorically spoke out against the plans for a breakthrough, believing that the Red Army would soon go on the counteroffensive, and that the garrison's task was to defend the fortress until reinforcements arrived.

He was taken prisoner along with the rest of the survivors after the fall of the citadel on June 26, and spent the rest of his life in German detention. He died in the prison camp Nürnberg-Langwasser (Stalag XIII D) on July 21, 1944.

References

1898 births
1944 deaths
Soviet military personnel of the Russian Civil War
Soviet prisoners of war
World War II prisoners of war held by Germany
Prisoners who died in German detention
Soviet military personnel killed in World War II